Tairov, is a village in the Armavir Province of Armenia. Administratively it is subordinate to the community of Parakar and is located 1km east to Parakar. Tairov was founded in 1921.

See also 
Armavir Province

References

World Gazeteer: Armenia – World-Gazetteer.com

Populated places in Armavir Province